Edward Bigland (ca. 16205 August 1704) was an English lawyer and politician. He was a Member of Parliament (MP) for Nottingham from 1689 to 1690.

Life
He was the son of Edward Bigland, rector of East Leake, Nottinghamshire. He matriculated at Queens' College, Cambridge at Easter 1637, graduating B.A. in 1641, and M.A. in 1644, and becoming a Fellow. He was admitted at Gray's Inn, 26 June 1648.

He became serjeant-at-law in 1680, and recorder of Nottingham. He was M.P. for Nottingham in 1689. He settled at Long Whatton, Leicestershire, and was buried there 5 August 1704.

References

1620s births
1704 deaths
Year of birth uncertain
Politicians from Nottingham
Alumni of Queens' College, Cambridge
Members of Gray's Inn
English lawyers
English MPs 1689–1690
People from East Leake
People from Long Whatton